Yên Định may refer to:

Yên Định District in Thanh Hóa Province, Vietnam
Yên Định, Bắc Giang in Sơn Động District, Bắc Giang Province, Vietnam
Yên Định, Nam Định, the district capital of Hải Hậu District, Nam Định Province, Vietnam